Jeanne III may refer to:

 Jeanne III, Countess of Burgundy (1308–1349)
 Jeanne III d'Albret (1528–1572)